Noontide Press is an American publishing entity which describes itself as a publisher of "hard-to-find books and recordings from a dissident, 'politically incorrect' perspective." It publishes numerous antisemitic pseudohistorical titles, including The Protocols of the Elders of Zion and The International Jew. The Anti-Defamation League describes its founding and early years:

The Institute for Historical Review and its publishing arm, Noontide Press, were founded in 1978 by the leading organizer of modern American anti-Semitism, Willis Carto, and his wife Elisabeth. Based near Los Angeles in Torrance, California, the group pioneered organizing efforts among Holocaust deniers, who had heretofore labored mostly in isolation and obscurity. The group's first "Revisionist Convention" in September 1979 featured speakers from the U.S., France, Germany, England and Sweden, many of whom subsequently contributed articles to the inaugural issue of IHR's Journal of Historical Review the following spring. With the Noontide Press offering a means for the sale and distribution of their writings, professional deniers had found something of a rainmaker in Carto.

However, the Southern Poverty Law Center claim it was founded in the early 1970s. Also other sources cite the 1960s publications by this press.

Noontide Press is the distributor of the remaining backstock of books published by Ralph Myles, a company set up by libertarian revisionist historian James J. Martin, who sold the remaining stock of Ralph Myles books to the IHR before his death.

The group has been listed as a hate group by the Southern Poverty Law Center due to its Holocaust denial and white-separatist activities.

Noontide Press suffered a firebomb attack in July 1984, by members of the Jewish Defense League, a far-right Jewish terrorist organization. The culprits were not implicated for the attack until 2002, when an imprisoned member of the group claimed responsibility. No one was charged for the bombing.

United States Holocaust Memorial Museum shooter James von Brunn was a former employee of the group.

See also
Liberty Lobby
Barnes Review
American Free Press

References

External links
Noontide Press website

Antisemitism in the United States
Political book publishing companies
Publishing companies established in 1978
Protocols of the Elders of Zion
Far-right publications in the United States
Holocaust denial in the United States
Holocaust-denying websites